Ehlerange is a small town in the commune of Sanem, in south-western Luxembourg.  , the town has a population of 729.

References 

Sanem
Towns in Luxembourg